Chartchai Ngamsan (born 1973) is a Thai actor. His most notable role is as Sua Dum (Black Tiger) in Tears of the Black Tiger, a 2000 Thai western film. Before that, he had a supporting role in Dang Bireley's and Young Gangsters, also playing a character named Dum, who was a sidekick to Puu Bottlebomb, portrayed by Supakorn Kitsuwon. In Tears of the Black Tiger, Chartchai took the lead role and Supakorn portrayed an unwilling sidekick. He got a Bachelor from Bangkok University.

Filmography
 Dang Bireley's and Young Gangsters (1997)
 Tears of the Black Tiger (2000)
 Mah-Aut (2003)
 Dark Water (2007)
 The Brutal River (2005)
 Kill Tim (2008)
 Queens of Langkasuka (2008)

External links

1973 births
Living people
Place of birth missing (living people)
Chartchai Ngamsan